Euthrenopsis otagoensis is a species of marine gastropod mollusc in the family Buccinidae. It was first described by Baden Powell in 1929. It is endemic to the waters of New Zealand. It is the type species for the genus Euthrenopsis.

Description

Euthrenopsis otagoensis has a shell with six whorls, with strong and even convex outlines. The species measures 12 mm by 5 mm.

Distribution
The species is endemic to New Zealand. The holotype was collected in the waters east of the Taiaroa Head in the Otago Region of New Zealand. Additional specimens have been identified in the Foveaux Strait and the Cook Strait.

References

 Spencer, H.G., Marshall, B.A. & Willan, R.C. (2009). Checklist of New Zealand living Mollusca. Pp 196-219. in: Gordon, D.P. (ed.) New Zealand inventory of biodiversity. Volume one. Kingdom Animalia: Radiata, Lophotrochozoa, Deuterostomia. Canterbury University Press, Christchurch
 Maxwell, P. A. (2009). Cenozoic Mollusca. Pp 232-254 in Gordon, D. P. (ed.) New Zealand inventory of biodiversity. Volume one. Kingdom Animalia: Radiata, Lophotrochozoa, Deuterostomia. Canterbury University Press, Christchurch

Buccinidae
Gastropods described in 1929
Gastropods of New Zealand
Endemic fauna of New Zealand
Endemic molluscs of New Zealand
Molluscs of the Pacific Ocean
Taxa named by Arthur William Baden Powell